Kings of Atlantis is an American animation series produced exclusively for YouTube Red and YouTube Kids, which starred Cody Owen & JoeBuz. The series premiered on April 7, 2017. The season finale was released on May 26, 2017.

The 13 episodes series is based on various Atlantis movies and series and co-produced by Omnia Media and Mighty Coconut. According to TubeFilter, Kings of Atlantis was the first YouTube Red original series for YouTube Kids. Even though the series is based on various Atlantis movies and series, "this is not a Machinima series and does not feature realistic graphics like some movies and series do."

Each 11-minute episode finds Cody and Joe in an adventure in the city of Atlantis.

Cast 
 Cody Owen as Cody
 Joseph Kenny as Joe
 Kevin Dean as Professor Pikalus
 Larry Brantley as Phaeton
 Elizabeth Maxwell as Anemone
 Kelli Bland as Coral
 Brian Coughlin as Alchemor
 Robert Ashker Kraft as King Atlas
 Cameron Hales as Cameron
 Ben Wolfe as The Kraken Kid
 Shannon McCormick as Crabnan the Cabmerian

Episodes

References

2010s American animated television series
2017 American television series debuts
2017 American television series endings
American children's animated action television series
American children's animated adventure television series
American animated web series
English-language television shows
YouTube Premium original series